Colin Sinclair (14 July 1896 – 19 February 1959) was an Australian rules footballer who played with Essendon in the Victorian Football League (VFL).

Notes

External links 

1896 births
1959 deaths
Australian rules footballers from Melbourne
Essendon Football Club players
People from Essendon, Victoria